"Honky Tonk Attitude" is a song co-written and recorded by American country music artist Joe Diffie.  It was released in March 1993 as the lead single and title track from his album Honky Tonk Attitude.  The song reached the top five of the Billboard Hot Country Singles & Tracks (now Hot Country Songs) chart and peaked at number 11 on the Canadian RPM Country Tracks chart.  The song was written by Diffie and Lee Bogan.

Content
The song is an uptempo in which the narrator states that everyone goes to the honky tonk to dance away their blues. He states that everyone needs to have a "honky tonk attitude".

Music video
The music video was directed by Richard Jernigan and premiered in early 1993.

Chart positions
"Honky Tonk Attitude" debuted on the U.S. Billboard Hot Country Singles & Tracks for the week of March 20, 1993.

Year-end charts

References

1993 singles
1992 songs
Joe Diffie songs
Songs written by Joe Diffie
Song recordings produced by Bob Montgomery (songwriter)
Epic Records singles